MBC 1 is a Mauritian free-to-air television channel of the Mauritius Broadcasting Corporation. It was launched as the first TV channel in the country on 8 June 1964.

Programming
Anou Bouze
Anou Riyer (Let's Laugh)
Beat Box (Musical Show) 
Bhojpuri Top 5 (musical show) 
Bollywood Top 10 (musical show) 
Devon Ke Dev - Mahadev 
Dossier de la Rédaction
Eclats de Vie 
Fami Pa Kontan (The Family Is Not Happy)
Gulmohar ki Chaon Mein
Jamai Raja 
Siya Ke Ram
Le Journal (news)
Live n Direk (musical show)
Mangeons Veg (Let's Eat Veg)
The Power 
Priorité Santé (Health Priority)
Rangsaaz 
Samachar (news) 
Dil Hai Hindustani (season 2)
Talk Back
TV Mag
Viens Decouvrir (Come and Discover)

History

On November 3, 2013, MBC (Mauritius) introduced the MBC News Channel which airs between 7AM-6PM on MBC 1, bringing up-to-date local, regional and international news every hour including reportages and documentaries in major Mauritian speaking language. MBC News Channel remained a block on MBC 1, from 7 AM to 6PM until January 31, 2015 where it was removed.

Former local programmes broadcast on MBC News Channel
These programmes were broadcast before the MBC News Channel was discontinued.
A Vous De Juger (The decision is yours)
Aaj Ki Khabrein (Today's News)
Etre Femme (Being Woman)
Flash News
Flash Samachar (Hindi Flash News)
Information (News)
MBC Morning Show
Samachar (Hindi News)
Sports
Zournal Kreol (Creole News)

Some of these shows are also telecast on Senn Kreol, YSTV and MBC 3.

See also
 Mauritius Broadcasting Corporation
 Kids Channel (Mauritian TV channel)
 MBC 2 (Mauritian TV channel)
 MBC 3 (Mauritian TV channel)
 BTV (Mauritian TV channel)
 List of television channels in Mauritius
 Media of Mauritius
 List of programs broadcast by the Mauritius Broadcasting Corporation

References

1964 establishments in Mauritius
Television channels and stations established in 1964
Television channels in Mauritius
Mauritius Broadcasting Corporation